Marian Ispir (born 4 April 1992), is a Romanian rugby union player who plays as a Winger for CEC Bank SuperLiga club CSM București and has previously played for his home country Romania and has also played for the Romanian national rugby 7's team.

References

External links
Superliga Player Profile
ItsRugby Player Profile
ESPN Scrum Player Profile

1992 births
Living people
Romanian rugby union players
Romania international rugby union players
Rugby union wings